Jerrel Marquis Jernigan (born June 14, 1989) is a former American football wide receiver. He was drafted by the New York Giants in the third round of the 2011 NFL Draft and won Super Bowl XLVI with the team against the New England Patriots. He played college football at Troy. Jerrel currently works at Eufaula High School as the Head football coach where he played in high school.

Professional career

Pre-draft
He was considered one of the best wide receiver prospects for the 2011 NFL Draft. He was a starter all four years for the Trojans. Jernigan's body frame and playing style was compared to the likes of DeSean Jackson and Steve Smith.

New York Giants
Jernigan was drafted by the New York Giants in the third round with the 83rd overall pick in the 2011 NFL Draft. Through four seasons with the Giants, Jernigan played in 34 games catching 38 passes for 391 yards with 2 touchdowns.

At the end of the 2011 season, Jernigan and the Giants appeared in Super Bowl XLVI. He had three kick returns for 71 net yards as the Giants defeated the New England Patriots by a score of 21–17.

Winnipeg Blue Bombers 
After not playing professional football in 2015, Jernigan signed with the Winnipeg Blue Bombers of the Canadian Football League on April 12, 2016.

References

External links
 
 Troy Trojans bio

1989 births
American football return specialists
American football wide receivers
Living people
New York Giants players
People from Barbour County, Alabama
People from Midway, Alabama
Players of American football from Alabama
Troy Trojans football players